Easley is a small lunar impact crater that is located on the southern hemisphere on the near side of the Moon, east of the large crater Humboldt and west of Curie. 

The crater's name was approved by the IAU on 1 February 2021.  It is named after the American computer scientist, mathematician, and rocket scientist Annie J. Easley (1933-2011).

References